Laura Zigman is an American novelist and freelance journalist who lives outside Boston, Massachusetts. She is the author of the novels Animal Husbandry, Her, Dating Big Bird, Piece of Work, and Separation Anxiety. She is co-author with professional matchmaker Patti Novak of the self-help book Get Over Yourself: How to Get Real, Get Serious, and Get Ready to Find True Love.

Career
Zigman grew up in Newton, Massachusetts, and graduated from the University of Massachusetts Amherst. She worked for ten years as a publicist for Times Books, Vintage Books, Turtle Bay Books, Atlantic Monthly Press, and Alfred A. Knopf, before moving to Washington, D.C., and beginning a career as a writer. Her first novel was Animal Husbandry (1998), which was made into the 2001 romantic comedy Someone Like You, starring Ashley Judd and Hugh Jackman. Her 2006 novel Piece of Work (described in USA Today as "one part pleasant, one part unoriginal") was optioned for a movie screenplay by Tom Hanks's Playtone.

She is often described as a writer of chick lit, and described herself as "heartbroken, urban, single, postfeminist", which prompted her to write so other people would know that "I am not the only loser in the world who feels lonely". Her books have been characterized as breezy, clever, engaging and naughty, with reviewers comparing her style to that of novelists Olivia Goldsmith and Fay Weldon.  In addition to writing novels and non-fiction books, she is an irregular contributor to The New York Times and The Huffington Post, and creator of a series of Xtranormal videoclips, which she publishes on her blog.

Personal life
Zigman is married and has a son.

References

External links

Living people
Novelists from Massachusetts
Writers from Washington, D.C.
University of Massachusetts Amherst alumni
American women novelists
20th-century American novelists
20th-century American women writers
American women non-fiction writers
20th-century American non-fiction writers
Year of birth missing (living people)
21st-century American women